The Ethiopian cisticola (Cisticola lugubris) is a species of bird in the family Cisticolidae. It is found in south-central Africa.

Alternate common names are Abyssinian black-backed cisticola, and winding cisticola (Ethiopian) (eBird).

Taxonomy
The Ethiopian cisticola is monotypic. This taxon was split from the winding cisticola by the IOC and HBW, as were the rufous-winged cisticola, Luapula cisticola and coastal cisticola. The Clements (2017) and Howard and Moore (2014) world lists consider these taxa as a single species, the winding cisticola C. galactotes (sensu lato).

Distribution and habitat
This species is found in the highlands of Ethiopia and Eritrea.

Its natural habitats are tropical seasonally wet or flooded grassland and swamps.

References

External links

Ethiopian cisticola
Birds of the Horn of Africa
Fauna of Ethiopia
Ethiopian cisticola